The 2018 Mandaluyong El Tigre season is the only season of the franchise in the Maharlika Pilipinas Basketball League (MPBL).

Key dates
 June 12, 2018: Regular Season Begins.

Roster

Datu Cup

Standings

Game log

|- style="background:#fcc;"
| 1
| June 12
| Muntinlupa
| L 74–86
| Bobby Ray Parks Jr. (21)
| Bobby Ray Parks Jr. (10)
| Bobby Ray Parks Jr. (4)
| Smart Araneta Coliseum
| 0–1
|- style="background:#bfb;"
| 2
| June 23
| Zamboanga
| W 71–61
| Prince Rivero (18)
| Gian Abrigo (13)
| Bobby Ray Parks Jr. (15)
| Imus City Sports Complex
| 1–1

|- style="background:#;"
| 3
| July 5
| Pasig
| 
| 
| 
| 
| Blue Eagle Gym
| 1–1
|- style="background:#;"
| 4
| July 18
| Navotas
| 
| 
| 
| 
| Bataan People's Center
| 1–1
|- style="background:#;"
| 5
| July 31
| Rizal
| 
| 
| 
| 
| Ynares Center
| 1–1

References

Mandaluyong El Tigre Season, 2018